Feklukha is a rural locality (a village) in Kolengskoye Rural Settlement, Verkhovazhsky District, Vologda Oblast, Russia. The population was 329 as of 2002. There are 5 streets.

Geography 
Feklukha is located 61 km southeast of Verkhovazhye (the district's administrative centre) by road. Kharitonovskaya is the nearest rural locality.

References 

Rural localities in Verkhovazhsky District